Shankarrao Bhavrao Chavan (14 July 1920 – 26 February 2004) was an Indian politician who served twice as Chief Minister of Maharashtra from 1975 until 1977 and from 13 March 1986 until 26 June 1988. He was Finance Minister of India from 1988 to 1989 and served as Home Minister of India in the P. V. Narasimha Rao cabinet from 21 June 1991 to 16 May 1996. He served as Home Minister of India in the Rajiv Gandhi cabinet 31 December 1984 to 12 March 1986.

Early life and family
Chavan completed his Bachelor of Arts from Madras University and LL.B. from Osmania University. He started his career as an advocate. He initiated the Student's Movement and gave up practice of law during the 'Quit Court' Movement in the former Hyderabad State.

He was elected to Bombay State Assembly from Dharmabad in 1957 and to Maharashtra Vidhan Sabha from Dharmabad during the 1962 election and from Bhokar during 1967, 1972 and 1978 elections.

His son Ashok Chavan served  as chief minister of Maharashtra. His daughter-in-law and Ashok Chavan's wife, Ameeta Ashokrao Chavan represented Bhokar in Maharashtra Vidhan sabha.

Political career

Membership in legislative bodies
 Bombay State Legislative Council, 1956
 Maharashtra Legislative Assembly, 1960–80
 Lok Sabha, 1980–84 and 1985–86
 Maharashtra Legislative Council, 8 July 1986 – 21 October 1988
 Rajya Sabha from Maharshtra 28 October 1988 – 2 April 1990, April 1990 – April 1996 and April 1996 – April 2002
 Committee on Rules, Rajya Sabha, 1992–96

Leadership in Rajya Sabha
 Congress(I) Party in Rajya Sabha 2 July 1991 – 15 May 1996
 Leader of the House in Rajya Sabha from 2 July 1991 to 15 May 1996 elected to the Rajya Sabha in October 1988, re-elected in April 1990 and again in April 1996

Chief Minister 
Shankarrao served as chief Minister of Maharashtra on two occasions.

21 February 1975 – 16 May 1977: This coincided with The Emergency declared by prime Minister, Indira Gandhi. Sanjay Gandhi, the son of the prime minister became the power behind the throne and Chavan had to meet Sanjay first to get an appointment with the prime minister  
12 March 1986 – 26 June 1988

Union Cabinet Minister, Government of India 
 Culture and Social Welfare & Education (HRD), 17 October 1980 – 8 August 1981
 Deputy Chairman, Planning Commission, 8 August 1981 to 18 July 1984
 Defence, 2 August 1984 to December 30, 1984
 Home, 31 December 1984 – 12 March 1986
 Finance 25 June 1988 – 2 December 1989
 Home, 21 June 1991 to 16 May 1996

Positions

Chancellor
 Tilak Maharashtra University, Pune (Deemed University)

President

The Bharat Scouts and Guides, New Delhi (April 1983 to November 1998)
 Maratha Mitra Mandal, New Delhi

Chairman
 Indian Institute of Public Administration (IIPA), New Delhi(1981-2004)
 Shri Sharda Bhavan Education Society, Nanded
 Committee on Human Resource Development, Parliament of India
 Ethics Committee, Rajya Sabha

Member
 Business Advisory Committee, Rajya Sabha
 General Purposes Committee, Rajya Sabha
 Executive Committee of the Indian Parliamentary Group
 Consultative Committee for the Ministry of Railways
 Parliamentary Affairs Committee of Congress(I) Party in Parliament
 All India Congress Committee (A.I.C.C.)
 Central Cooperative Union, Hyderabad

In Memory
 Dr. Shankarrao Chavan Government Medical College & Hospital, Nanded
 MMM's Shankarrao Chavan Law College, Pune
 NWCMC's Dr.Shankarrao Chavan Auditorium, Near SGGS Stadium 
 SBES's Shankarrao Chavan Memorial, VIP Road
 Shankarrao Chavan Chowk, Kamtha-Nanded
 Shankarrao Chavan Chowk, Chimegaon Nanded
 Dr.Shankarrao Chavan Garden & Library, CIDCO, Nanded

References

External links
 http://timesnow.tv/Newsdtls.aspx?NewsID=22813
 http://www.bsgindia.org/
 

1920 births
2004 deaths
Chief Ministers of Maharashtra
Rajya Sabha members from Maharashtra
Scouting and Guiding in India
Maharashtra MLAs 1960–1962
Maharashtra MLAs 1962–1967
Maharashtra MLAs 1967–1972
Maharashtra MLAs 1972–1978
Maharashtra MLAs 1978–1980
Marathi politicians
India MPs 1980–1984
India MPs 1984–1989
Lok Sabha members from Maharashtra
University of Madras alumni
People from Marathwada
Chief ministers from Indian National Congress
Ministers of Internal Affairs of India
Defence Ministers of India
Education Ministers of India
Finance Ministers of India
Ministers for Corporate Affairs